General elections were held in South Africa on 12 June 1929. The National Party under James Barry Munnik Hertzog won an outright majority in the House of Assembly. Hertzog had the opportunity to form a government without the aid of the Labour Party. In fact the Pact government continued, with two ministers from the Creswell Labour faction remaining in office. The National Party remained the dominant party, for its second consecutive term.

Due to the split in the Labour Party, just eight MPs were elected for the party, of whom only four sat on the government benches. The leadership disputed between Colonel Frederic Creswell (of the Creswell Labour faction) and Walter Madeley (from the National Council Labour faction) following the split.

Delimitation of electoral divisions
The South Africa Act 1909 had provided for a delimitation commission to define the boundaries for each electoral division. The representation by province, under the fifth delimitation report of 1928, is set out in the table below. The figures in brackets are the number of electoral divisions in the previous (1923) delimitation. If there is no figure in brackets then the number was unchanged.

Results

See also
 1929 in South Africa

References

Bibliography
 South Africa 1982: Official Yearbook of the Republic of South Africa, published by Chris van Rensburg Publications
 The South African Constitution, by H.J. May (3rd edition 1955, Juta & Co)

General elections in South Africa
South Africa
General
June 1929 events